Bloc Festival was an electronic music festival in England which began in 2006. It was devoted to electronic music of all genres including electro, hip hop, IDM, techno, house music, reggae, drum and bass and dubstep, and incorporated both DJ sets and live shows. Following a return of the festival in 2015, it was announced that the 2016 edition of the festival would be the last.

History

See also 
List of electronic music festivals

References

External links
 Bloc London website
 Bloc website
 Facebook Page

Music festivals established in 2006
Music festivals in Norfolk
Music festivals in Somerset
Recurring events established in 2007
Electronic music festivals in the United Kingdom